The Walter Marsh House is a historic house at Maple and Torrence Streets in Pangburn, Arkansas.  It is a -story wood-frame structure, with a hip roof, novelty siding, and a stone foundation.  The roof extends over a front porch, which is supported by simple box columns on piers.  A two-window hip-roof dormer projects above the porch.  Built about 1920, it is a well-preserved vernacular double-pile residence of the period.

The house was listed on the National Register of Historic Places in 1991.

See also
National Register of Historic Places listings in White County, Arkansas

References

Houses on the National Register of Historic Places in Arkansas
Houses completed in 1920
Houses in White County, Arkansas
National Register of Historic Places in White County, Arkansas
1920 establishments in Arkansas